Erqi Road is a station on Line 1 of Wuhan Metro, opened upon the completion of Line 1 (Phase 2) on July 29, 2010. It is an elevated station situated at the intersection of Jiefang Avenue and Erqi Road. The station has one island platform and two siding tracks to the north of the station, connected by a pair of crossover tracks, accommodating trains entering and exiting services during peak hours.

Erqi Road Station is accessible from the site of Jinghan Workers Union Headquarters, Hankou East Shopping Park, and Jiang'an District Railroad Cultural Palace.

Station layout
Erqi Road Station is a three-story elevated station built entirely along Jiefang Avenue. It has a single island platform.

Exits

There are currently three exits in service, A; B; and C. They are all located on Jiefang Avenue.

Transfers

Bus transfers to routes 3, 4, 211, 229, 212, 301, 508, 509, 555, 577, 583, 622, 707, 717, 721, 727 and 809 are available at Erqi Road Station.

Future Development

References

Wuhan Metro stations
Line 1, Wuhan Metro
Railway stations in China opened in 2010